Thrikaripur State assembly constituency Previously Nileshwaram constituency' is one of the 140 state legislative assembly constituencies in Kerala state in southern India.  It is also one of the 7 state legislative assembly constituencies included in the Kasaragod Lok Sabha constituency. As of the 2021 assembly elections, the current MLA is M. Rajagopalan of CPI(M).

Thrikaripur constituency came into existence in 1977. It was created by replacing the Nileshwaram constituency which had existed from 1957 to 1977.

Local self governed segments
Thrikaripur Niyamasabha constituency is composed of the following local self-governed segments:

Members of Legislative Assembly 
The following list contains all members of Kerala legislative assembly who have represented the constituency:

Key

  

As Nileshwaram

As Thrikaripur

Election results

Niyamasabha Election 2021 
There were 2,02,249 registered voters in the constituency for the 2021 election.

}}

}}

}}

}}

Niyamasabha Election 2016 
There were 1,90,119 registered voters in the constituency for the 2016 election.

Niyamasabha Election 2011 
There were 1,78,139 registered voters in the constituency for the 2011 election.

See also
 Thrikaripur
 Kasaragod district
 List of constituencies of the Kerala Legislative Assembly
 2016 Kerala Legislative Assembly election

References 

Assembly constituencies of Kerala

State assembly constituencies in Kasaragod district